Kivelä is a Finnish surname. Notable people with the surname include:

 Birger Kivelä (1920–2013), Finnish diver
 Eero Kivelä (born 1930), Finnish sprinter
 Antero Kivelä (born 1955), Finnish ice hockey goaltender
 John Kivela (1969–2013), American politician
 Sami Kivelä (born 1979), Finnish comic book artist
 Mai Kivelä (born 1982), Finnish human rights activist and feminist
 Oona Kivelä (born 1983), Finnish professional acrobat
 Heidi Kivelä (born 1988), Finnish football midfielder
 Aki Kivelä (born 1992), Finnish ice hockey player

Finnish-language surnames